Stephanie Andersen (born 19 June 1992) is a Danish handball player who currently plays for Ikast Håndbold.

References

1992 births
Living people
People from Randers
Danish female handball players
Sportspeople from the Central Denmark Region